Narimani-ye Sofla (also Romanized as Narīmānī-ye Soflá and Narīmānī Soflá; also known as Narīmānī) is a village in Abravan Rural District, Razaviyeh District, Mashhad County, Razavi Khorasan Province, Iran. At the 2006 census, its population was 1,512, in 394 families.

References 

Populated places in Mashhad County